A Kind of Anger is a novel by British thriller writer Eric Ambler, first published in 1964. Like many of Ambler's post-war novels the thriller plot is laced with elements of comedy.

Plot summary
A car comes hurtling down the drive of a remote villa near Zurich, crashes into a lorry, but carries on without stopping. When the police investigate, they find the body of an exiled Iraqi general inside the villa. He has been tortured and shot three times, and the house has been ransacked. Witnesses say the fleeing car was driven by a beautiful young woman.

Dutch journalist Piet Maas is tasked by his editor at the (fictional) news magazine World Reporter with tracking down the mystery woman - who has been identified as the general's mistress, Lucia Bernardi - and getting the full story. After lengthy detective-work he succeeds and discovers that the general was at the heart of a planned uprising of Kurdish nationalists inside Iraq. He had made detailed notes about the uprising and it was these that his murderers were seeking. Lucia had managed to hide from the intruders, then escape from the villa with the notes.

It turns out that there is disagreement among the Kurdish activists, some wanting the uprising to go ahead, others fearing it is too dangerous and so trying to prevent it. Naturally, the Iraqi government wants to find out everything it can about the conspiracy. And so does an Italian oil company which has offered a new Kurdish administration a more favourable percentage of revenue if it is allowed to replace the British and American oil companies currently working in Kurdistan.

All of these parties, and their hired agents, are now after Lucia, who is on the run in fear of her life.

Having filed a report of events to his editor, Maas quits the magazine to throw in his lot with Lucia and together they conspire to sell the notes to the highest bidder. The novel describes in detail the anonymous phone calls, safe houses, elaborate aliases and clandestine meetings required to carry this out, and includes a number of tense scenes. In the final act they call in the help of a con-man who Lucia used to work with and manage to extract payment from not one but two rival agents, square things with the police, and rehabilitate Maas with his employers, before driving off with the loot.

Analysis
Like its predecessor The Light of Day, A Kind of Anger is a comedy-thriller, humorous in tone and with a happy ending.

The novel is a first-person narrative told by the journalist Piet Maas. He refers to his troubled past when, following the collapse of a magazine he'd set up and his discovery of his girlfriend's infidelity, he tried to kill himself. As the novel progresses, though, he reveals himself as a tough, imaginative and resourceful planner of complicated arrangements. Early in the novel Lucia's former conman partner, Philip Sanger, had speculated that Piet, dispensing with his past anger at his business failure and at his unfaithful girlfriend, was now driven by 'a new kind of anger', anger against Lucia's enemies. Towards the end of the book Sanger revises his opinion. He now thinks that what drives Piet isn't new but as old as the hills: he has discovered his vocation as a crook. Following his suicide attempt, instead of prescribing pills and electro-shock treatment, his psychiatrists should just have told him to go rob a bank.

The title itself thus adds to the numerous comments throughout the text which help to create the novel's comically subversive and amoral tone.

Context
Although comic in overall intention, the plot of the novel is rooted in historical and political realities, namely the troubled history of the Kurds. This is explained at some length in the novel, from the post-Great War Treaty of Sèvres onwards. Mention is also made of the 1958 coup which overthrew the monarchy to create the republic of Iraq. Situating the plot in this political context gives the novel a sense of urgency and reality.

Reception
The New York Times wrote that "as anti‐heroes go, Piet Maas is a fairly extreme case". Kirkus Reviews wrote that Ambler ensures "a well-meshed, plausible plot and credible characters."

References

1964 British novels
Novels by Eric Ambler
The Bodley Head books